Jefferson City is an Amtrak train station in Jefferson City, Missouri, United States. The station is located on the ground floor of the former Union Hotel, which was built in 1855 and is part of the Jefferson Landing State Historic Site. The Amtrak station was previously located at the old Missouri Pacific Railroad station before moving two blocks west to its current location in 1984.

The station has neither checked baggage service nor a Quik-Trak ticketing kiosk, so tickets must be purchased in advance.

The entire Union Hotel building (including the station) was closed on October 2, 2019, due to concerns that its exterior masonry was no longer structurally sound after a bulge appeared in its north wall. In December 2019, a temporary station consisting of a modular trailer was established in a nearby parking lot. While monitoring shows that the bulge is not significantly worsening, the building remains closed and has been placed on Missouri Preservation's "2021 Places in Peril" list. Planning and design for an estimated $9 million, two-year project to repair the building is scheduled to start in July 2022. In addition to stabilizing the structure and improving its waterproofing, the project will modernize the building and bring it up to code. , funding for the project was waiting to be appropriated in the state's FY23 budget by the Missouri General Assembly.

On November 9, 2022, Amtrak confirmed that it was still planning to work on improving the station.

See also 

List of Amtrak stations

References

External links 

Jefferson City Amtrak Station (USA Rail Guide -- TrainWeb)

Amtrak stations in Missouri
Railway stations in the United States opened in 1855
Railway hotels in the United States
Buildings and structures in Cole County, Missouri
Buildings and structures in Jefferson City, Missouri